András Gárdos (born 9 January 1991) is a Hungarian former football player who played as a midfielder. He had a spell on loan at Sheffield United but failed to break into the English club's first team.

Playing career
After coming through the youth ranks at MTK Budapest and Ferencváros. Gárdos was loaned to Fradi's sister club Sheffield United during the January 2011 transfer window.

Club statistics

Updated to games played as of 9 March 2014.

Honours
Ferencváros
Hungarian League Cup: 2012–13

References

External links
 Profile at HLSZ.
 Profile at MLSZ.
 

1991 births
Living people
Footballers from Budapest
Hungarian footballers
Association football midfielders
Ferencvárosi TC footballers
Sheffield United F.C. players
BFC Siófok players
Soroksár SC players
Nemzeti Bajnokság I players
Nemzeti Bajnokság II players
Hungarian expatriate footballers
Expatriate footballers in England
Hungarian expatriate sportspeople in England